A latka or latke is a type of potato pancake.

Latka may also refer to:

 Dariusz Łatka (born 1978), Polish footballer
 Martin Latka (born 1984), Czech footballer
 Ramesh Latke (1970-2022), 21st century Indian politician
 Latka Gravas, a character on the TV show Taxi
 the title character of Latke, the Lucky Dog, a children's picture book
 PZL SM-4 Łątka, a Polish prototype helicopter